Yecuatla  is a municipality located in the north zone in the State of Veracruz, about 40 km from state capital Xalapa. It has a surface of 135.72 km2. The name comes from the language Náhuatl, Yec-uauh-tlan; that means “Place of three snakes ".

Geographic

The municipality of  Yecuatla  is bordered to the north-east by Colipa, to the south by Chiconquiaco, to the west by Misantla and to the north-west by Colipa.

Agriculture

It produces principally maize, bean, green chile, orange fruit and coffee.

Celebrations

Every Augusts, a festival is held to celebrate Virgen de la Asunción, patron of the town and in December there is a festival held in honor of the Virgin of Guadalupe.

Climate

The climate in  Yecuatla  is warm-regular with an average temperature of 22.5°C, with rains in summer and autumn.

References

External links 

  Municipal Official webpage
  Municipal Official Information

Municipalities of Veracruz